Prakash is a common given name in Asian, Hindu, Sanskrit names and widely used in Nepal, India and Sri Lanka. Prakash is generally used as a masculine name. The word prakash is derived from the Sanskrit word "prakāśa", meaning "bright light" or "sun light" or "moon light" or "light". Metaphorically, it designates the person as a source of enlightenment or wisdom.
From the Sanskrit 'pra' meaning "forth" and 'kāśa' meaning "shining." Hence the meaning "luminous; shining forth".

Film 

 Prakash (film), 2022 Nepali film

Notable people
Notable persons with this given name include:
 Prakash (film director), Kannada film director 
 Prakash Yashwant Ambedkar (born 1954), Indian politician from  Maharashtra
 Prakash Amritraj (born 1983), Indian tennis player 
 Prakash Amte, Indian medical doctor and social worker
 Prakash Bare, Indian Malayalam actor
 Prakash Bhandari (born 1935), Indian cricketer
 Prakash Dahake, Indian politician from Maharashtra
 Prakash Javadekar (born 1951), Indian politician from Madhya Pradesh
 Prakash Jha (born 1952), Indian film producer-director-screenwriter 
 Prakash John (born 1947), Canadian rock bassist
 Prakash Karat (born 1948), Indian communist politician 
 Prakash Mehra (1939–2009), Indian Hindi film producer and director 
 Prakash Munda, Indian cricketer
 Prakash Padukone (born 1955), Indian badminton player
 Prakash Raj (born 1965), Indian film actor, director, producer and television presenter
 Prakash Vir Shastri (1923–1977), Indian politician from Uttar Pradesh
 Prakash Kumar Singh chairman of Steel Authority of India Limited

Surname
 Aditya Prakash (architect) (1924–2008), Indian architect, painter, and author
 Aditya Prakash (badminton) (born 1990), Indian badminton player
 Amrita Prakash (born 1987), Indian actress in Hindi cinema
 Balaji Prakash (born 1968), Indian structural biologist and biochemist
 Cedric Prakash (born 1951), Indian Catholic priest and human rights activist
 Jose Prakash (1925–2012), Indian actor and singer in Malayalam cinema
 Khemchand Prakash (1907–1950), Indian musical composer for the Hindi film industry
 Madappa Prakash (born 1953), Indian-American physicist
 Neil Prakash, also known as Abu Khaled al-Cambodi (Arabic: أبو خالد الكمبودي), an Australian-born member of the Islamic State group
 Satya Prakash (born 1929), Indian physicist
 Tejasswi Prakash (born 1993), Indian actress in Hindi television
 Uday Prakash (born 1952), Indian author, scholar, and journalist
 Varshini Prakash, American climate activist

See also 
 Prakasam district, a district in Andhra Pradesh, India

Indian masculine given names
Nepalese masculine given names